Matías Exequiel Roskopf (born 14 January 1998) is an Argentine professional footballer who plays as a forward for Uruguayan club Central Español.

Club career

Boca Juniors
Roskopf started out in the youth ranks of Colón in 2007, prior to joining Boca Juniors five years later. In 2018, Roskopf joined Uruguayan Primera División side Torque on loan. He made his professional debut on 3 February, coming on as a second-half substitute against Nacional as Torque lost 2–4. He made his first start on 28 March against Boston River, which was followed by Roskopf scoring the first goals of his senior career in his next start during a 2–0 win over Peñarol on 31 March. He returned to Boca in December after twenty-five games and three goals as Torque were relegated.

Hermannstadt
Roskopf joined Romania's Hermannstadt in 2019. Roskopf was unable to appear for Hermannstadt in 2018–19 due to registration issues, after the club discovered he didn't have the required paperwork; with the forward subsequently applying for Italian citizenship whilst under contract.

Rapid București
However, in May 2019, Roskopf signed an agreement to join newly promoted Liga II side Rapid București for 2019–20. His bow arrived on 20 August in a 3–1 loss to Turris Turnu Măgurele, while his first goal came on 1 September versus CSM Reșița. He departed after three goals in seventeen matches.

Apollon Limassol
In January 2020, Roskopf agreed a move to Cyprus with Apollon Limassol. He appeared for his debut on 9 February against Enosis Neon Paralimni, participating for thirty-three minutes of a one-goal home defeat. That was his sole appearance in the First Division, in a season that was curtailed due to the COVID-19 pandemic one month later.

Universitatea Cluj
On 22 August, Roskopf sealed a return to Romanian football with Liga II outfit Universitatea Cluj. After just one start from three appearances, he mutually terminated his contract on 1 November - with the Cluj-Napoca club claiming a return to Boca Juniors was in the pipeline, though that never materialized.

Cavalry FC
On 30 December 2020, Roskopf signed with Canadian Premier League side Cavalry FC. However, due to issues caused by the COVID-19 pandemic preventing Roskopf from being able to join the team due to travel restrictions, they mutually agreed to terminate the contract on 15 April 2021 to allow Roskopf to join a new club.

Central Español
On 24 April 2021, Roskopf signed with Uruguayan Segunda División side Central Español.

International career
In 2015, Roskopf represented Argentina at the 2015 South American U-17 Championship and 2015 FIFA U-17 World Cup. He scored once in seven matches at the U17 Championship in Paraguay, which preceded three appearances at the subsequent U17 World Cup in Chile. He had previously featured for the U15s, notably at the 2013 South American U-15 Championship, whilst also training against the senior squad before the 2015 Copa América.

Career statistics
.

References

External links

1998 births
Living people
People from Paraná, Entre Ríos
Argentine people of Volga German descent
Argentine footballers
Argentina youth international footballers
Association football forwards
Argentine expatriate footballers
Expatriate footballers in Uruguay
Expatriate footballers in Romania
Expatriate footballers in Cyprus
Expatriate soccer players in Canada
Argentine expatriate sportspeople in Uruguay
Argentine expatriate sportspeople in Romania
Argentine expatriate sportspeople in Cyprus
Argentine expatriate sportspeople in Canada
Uruguayan Primera División players
Liga II players
Cypriot First Division players
Boca Juniors footballers
Montevideo City Torque players
FC Hermannstadt players
FC Rapid București players
Apollon Limassol FC players
FC Universitatea Cluj players
Cavalry FC players
Central Español players
Sportspeople from Entre Ríos Province